Green Lake (Tlingit: Gageit' Tá) is a lake/reservoir south of Sitka, Alaska. It is fed by the Vodopad River and outflows into Silver Bay.

The Medvejie Fish Hatchery short-term rears smolt (juvenile salmon) in net pens in Green Lake.

The lake is artificially expanded by the Green Lake Dam. Annually Green Lake Dam generates about 60 gigawatt hours of electricity. Green Lake Dam works in tandem with the Blue Lake Dam to provide hydropower to Sitka.

Notes

USGS Site information

Reservoirs in Alaska
Lakes of Sitka, Alaska
Glacial lakes of the United States
Buildings and structures in Sitka, Alaska
Protected areas of Sitka, Alaska